Rock N'Roll Cop is a 1994 Hong Kong action crime drama film produced and directed by Kirk Wong, starring Anthony Wong Chau Sang, Wu Hsing-kuo, Yu Rongguang, Carrie Ng and Chen Ming Chen.

Plot
In a rainy night, Captain Wong Kun and his colleagues were celebrating as Captain Wong' gained the opportunity to receive training in Beijing. After dinner, when Captain Wong's mentor is walking back home, Shum Chi-Hung and his fellows, known as the 'Chun-Lei Red Scarf', seek revenge and killed him.

The 'Chun-Lei Red Scarf' is known for being one of the most wanted criminals in both Shenzhen and Hong Kong. One day, they went to Mongkok and robbed a Mahjong school. Inspector Hung, selling gramophone records nearby, was involved in the gunfight. Later, as the Hong Kong Police received information from the Information Bureau, Hung was sent back to Shenzhen to collaborate with the Chinese authority in arresting the 'Chun-Lei Red Scarf'.

Hung then met Captain Wong. Together they start to seek for the 'Chun-Lei Red Scarf'. Th two parties met in a nightclub. After a gunfight, the 'Red Scarf' members fled away and hid themselves in Shenzhen.

Due to differences between their style, Hung and Captain Wong have some unhappy experience while helping each other at work. Hung asked to leave Shenzhen, but he also helped Wong to break the codes related to the 'Chun-Lei Red Scarf' before he left. Soon, Chi-Hung's girlfriend Hou-Yee went to Shenzhen to give Chi-Hung the money and fake passports he requested. Both Hong Kong and Chinese authority sent police to follow Hou-Yee at the same time. In order to control the situation, Captain Wong's team deliberately separated the Hong Kong police officials and destroy their plan. Desperate to solve the case, Inspector Hung decided to stay and help Captain Wong.

Hou-Yee was actually Captain Wong's former girlfriend. Wong wants Hou-Yee to stay away from danger as she helps Chi-Hung. When Hou-Yee met Chi-Hung, Chi-Hung killed Hou-Yee as she said she still 'remember' Captain Wong after all.

The Chinese Police arrested Chi-Hung at the same time. Inspector Hung's boss is angry of how Inspector Hung helped the Chinese authority. Through exerting diplomatic pressure, the Hong Kong Police forced the authority to send Chi-Hung back to Hong Kong.  When Captain Wong and Hung are escorting Chi-Hung back to Hong Kong, Chi-Hung's gang suddenly appears to kidnap Hung and save their boss. Bearing the risk of being illegal immigrants as they cross the border, Captain Wong climbed over the border and have a gunfight with the criminals. Finally, Wong saved Hung from danger and killed Chi-Hung in a rural village in Hong Kong.

Cast
Anthony Wong Chau Sang as Inspector Hung
Wu Hsing-kuo as Captain Wong Kun
Yu Rongguang as Shum Chi-Hung
Carrie Ng as Hou-Yee
Chen Ming Chen as Singer

Box office
The film grossed HK$5,184,309 at the Hong Kong box office during its theatrical run from 29 June to 13 July 1994 in Hong Kong.

Note

See also
List of Hong Kong films

External links

1994 films
1994 action thriller films
1994 crime drama films
Hong Kong action thriller films
Hong Kong crime drama films
1990s Cantonese-language films
Films set in China
Films set in Hong Kong
1990s Hong Kong films